Changyang Town is a town on eastern Fangshan District, Beijing, China. It borders Fengtai District in its north, Huangcun and Beizangcun Towns in its east, Liulihe Town in its south, Doudian and Liangxiang Towns as well as Gongchen Subdistrict in its west. In the 2020 census, its total population was 241,691.

History

Administrative Divisions 

In the year 2021, Changyang Town had 89 subdivisions, of which 8 communities and 22 villages:

See also 
 List of township-level divisions of Beijing

References 

Fangshan District
Towns in Beijing